The Central Electoral Commission of the Republic of Moldova (commonly abbreviated as CEC) is a permanent collegiate body of the Moldovan government. 
The president of CEC of Republic of Moldova is Cimil Dorin.

External links
 Comisia Electorală Centrală a Republicii Moldova

Moldova
Elections in Moldova
Government of Moldova